Jean Hyppolite (8 January 1907 – 26 October 1968) was a French philosopher known for championing the work of Georg Wilhelm Friedrich Hegel, and other German philosophers, and educating some of France's most prominent post-war thinkers. His major works include Genesis and Structure of Hegel's Phenomenology of Spirit and Studies on Marx and Hegel.

Life and career
Hyppolite was born in Jonzac. He was a graduate of the École Normale Supérieure (ENS) at roughly the same time as Jean-Paul Sartre. After graduation he embarked on a serious study of Hegel, teaching himself German in order to read Phenomenology of Spirit in the original. In 1939 he came out with his own translation and his commentary would later form the basis of the book Genesis and Structure of the Phenomenology of Spirit (published in 1947). After the Second World War, Hyppolite became a professor at the University of Strasbourg, before moving to the Sorbonne in 1949.

In 1952, Hyppolite published Logique et existence, a work that may have had a seminal effect on what was to become known as post-structuralism. This book tries to correlate Hegel's Phenomenology to his Logics (longer and shorter). In doing so, it raises the questions of language, being, and difference that were to become the hallmarks of new French philosophy at the end of the 20th century. The book was reviewed by the philosopher Gilles Deleuze. The translators of the English language edition of the text (SUNY Press, 1997) included Deleuze's review at the end of the volume.

In 1954, he became the director of the ENS and in 1955 produced a study of Karl Marx's earlier, more Hegelian period, at a time when the French interest in Hegel was at its apogee. In 1963, he was elected to the Collège de France and given a chair in The History of Philosophical Thought.

While philosophers such as Jean-Paul Sartre were known for producing new works influenced by German philosophy, Hyppolite is remembered as an expositor, teacher, and translator. He influenced a number of thinkers, including Gilles Deleuze, who studied Hegel under him at the Lycée Henri-IV, and Michel Foucault, as well as Jacques Derrida, Gérard Granel and Étienne Balibar (at the ENS).

Hyppolite died in Paris.

Works
 Genesis and Structure of Hegel's Phenomenology of Spirit (1947)
 Logic and Existence (1952)
 Studies on Marx and Hegel (1955)

See also
Alexandre Kojève
Jean Wahl

References

1907 births
1968 deaths
People from Charente-Maritime
Lycée Henri-IV alumni
School for Advanced Studies in the Social Sciences alumni
École Normale Supérieure alumni
French historians of philosophy
German–French translators
20th-century French philosophers
Academic staff of the University of Strasbourg
Academic staff of the University of Paris
Academic staff of the Collège de France
Academic staff of the École Normale Supérieure
20th-century French translators
Lycée Henri-IV teachers
20th-century French male writers
French male non-fiction writers